Blithfield Hall (pronounced locally as Bliffield), is a privately-owned Grade I listed country house in Staffordshire, England, situated some  east of Stafford,  southwest of Uttoxeter and  north of Rugeley.

The Hall, with its embattled towers and walls, has been the home of the Bagot family since the late 14th century. The present house is mainly Elizabethan, with a Gothic façade added in the 1820s to a design probably by John Buckler. The decoration of the house was carried out by the Gothic-style plasterer, Francis Bernasconi.

In 1945 the Hall, then in a neglected and dilapidated state, was sold by Gerald Bagot, 5th Baron Bagot, together with its  estate to South Staffordshire Waterworks Company, whose intention was to build a reservoir (completed in 1953). The 5th Baron died in 1946 having sold many of the contents of the house.

In September 1959 Lord Bagot sold Blithfield Hall at an open auction held in the Shrewsbury Arms, Rugeley. The property was bought for £12,000 (2011: £) by his wife Nancy, Lady Bagot.

The 6th Baron died in 1961. In 1986, the Hall was divided into four separate houses. The main part which incorporates the Great Hall is owned by the Bagot Jewitt Trust. The Bagot Jewitt family remain in residence.

On a Monday in early September every year, villagers from nearby Abbots Bromley visit the Hall to perform the Abbots Bromley Horn Dance.

Blithfield Hall is known as the home of a breed of goat, the Bagot goat. The part of the parish known as Bagot's Bromley took its name from ownership by the family since 1360. Bagot's Wood, the remains of the ancient Needwood Forest, also takes its name from the Bagots.

See also
 List of Grade I listed buildings in Staffordshire
 Listed buildings in Blithfield
 Bagot Barons and Baronets

References

 Blithfield Hall - A descriptive Survey and History Nancy, Lady Bagot (1966) English Life Publications

External links
Blithfield Hall website - This link is now all adverts - nothing useful to see.
History of Blithfield Hall
  Images of England:Blithfield Hall

Country houses in Staffordshire
Gothic Revival architecture in Staffordshire
Grade I listed houses in Staffordshire